is a joint-use passenger railway station in the town of Yorii, Saitama, Japan, jointly operated by East Japan Railway Company (JR East) and the private railway operators Tōbu Railway and Chichibu Railway. The station premises are managed by Chichibu Railway.

Lines
Yorii Station is served by the following three lines.
 Hachiko Line ( - )
 Chichibu Main Line ( - )

Station layout
The station consists of three island platforms, each serving two tracks for the Tōbu Tōjō Line, Chichibu Main Line, and Hachikō Line.

Platforms

History

The Hachikō Line was extended south to Ogawamachi on October 6, 1934.

From 17 March 2012, station numbering was introduced on the Tōbu Tōjō Line, with Yorii Station becoming "TJ-38".

Passenger statistics
In fiscal 2019, the station was used by an average of 3,821 passengers daily. In fiscal 2019, the JR station was used by an average of 385 passengers daily (boarding passengers only). In fiscal 2017, the Chichibu Railway station was used by an average of 1380 passengers daily.。

Surrounding area

 Yorii Town Office
 Yorii Library

Bus routes
Musashi Kanko
For Honjo-Waseda Station and  Honjo Station (Saitama)

See also
 List of railway stations in Japan

References

External links

 JR East station information 
 Tobu station information 
 Chichibu Railway station information 

Stations of East Japan Railway Company
Stations of Tobu Railway
Railway stations in Saitama Prefecture
Tobu Tojo Main Line
Hachikō Line
Railway stations in Japan opened in 1901
Yorii, Saitama